Tracadie-Sheila is a provincial electoral district for the Legislative Assembly of New Brunswick, Canada. It is centred on the town of Tracadie-Sheila and is 95% French speaking.

Members of the Legislative Assembly

Election results

2014–present

|-

|-

1995–2010

See also
 Tracadie (electoral district)

References

External links 
Website of the Legislative Assembly of New Brunswick
Map of Tracadie-Sheila riding as of 2018

New Brunswick provincial electoral districts